Eximacris superbum is a species of insect in family Acrididae. It is endemic to the United States.

Sources

Endemic fauna of the United States
Acrididae
Insects described in 1937
Taxonomy articles created by Polbot